The Stiff Upper Lip World Tour was a concert tour by the Australian hard rock band AC/DC in support of their fourteenth studio album, Stiff Upper Lip, which was released in 28 February 2000. This tour had 6 legs around the world lasting 11 months starting on 1 August 2000 in Grand Rapids, Michigan finishing on 8 July 2001 in Cologne, Germany.

Background
The tour began on 1 August 2000 at the Van Andel Arena in Grand Rapids, United States. The stage show featured a 40-foot bronze Angus statue with horns which was featured on the cover of the band's fourteenth studio album, Stiff Upper Lip. During the show, the statue released smoke out of its mouth with fire coming out of the head of its guitar. The Munich, Germany show on 14 June was filmed for Stiff Upper Lip Live.

A fan was fatally injured at the 14 October show in Ghent, Belgium when he fell several metres onto a concrete floor. In Phoenix, Arizona, a "fan" chucked two bottles of beer at Angus Young and was brought out of the concert by security during the breakdown of "Bad Boy Boogie".

Reception
Dale Martin, a reporter for the Victoria Advocate described the Alamodome show he attended as a triumphant return for the band, with fans welcoming them in full force - even as the audience got on their feet for the band's opening song, "You Shook Me All Night Long". He described the concert as "intense", detailing that Angus Young was his usual hyperactive self, as well as noting on the stage theatrics that were kept to a minimum, featuring a 30-foot high statue of Angus to remind the audience of his popularity. He noted that while the older fans were satisfied with the older material being performed, the younger audience were more familiar with the new material the band performed that night.

Setlist
The setlist for the tour featured the band's classic songs, but did not feature as many songs off of the new album.
"Stiff Upper Lip"
"You Shook Me All Night Long"
"Problem Child" or "Shot Down in Flames"
"Thunderstruck"
"Hell Ain't a Bad Place to Be"
"Hard as a Rock"
"Shoot to Thrill"
"Rock and Roll Ain't Noise Pollution"
"Safe in New York City" or "Sin City" or "What Do You Do for Money Honey"
"Bad Boy Boogie"
"Hells Bells"
"Meltdown" or "Get It Hot" or "Satellite Blues" or "Up to My Neck in You"
"The Jack"
"Back in Black"
"Dirty Deeds Done Dirt Cheap"
"Highway to Hell"
"Whole Lotta Rosie"
"Let There Be Rock"
Encore
"T.N.T."
"For Those About to Rock (We Salute You)"
"Ride On"

Tour dates

Box office score data

Personnel
Brian Johnson – lead vocals
Angus Young – lead guitar
Malcolm Young – rhythm guitar, backing vocals
Cliff Williams – bass, backing vocals
Phil Rudd – drums

Notes

References

Citations

Sources

External links

 ACDC.com Official website
 ACDCRocks.com Official website

AC/DC concert tours
2000 concert tours
2001 concert tours